Down the 'Gate is a British comedy television series which ran for two series on ITV from 1975 to 1976. It starred Reg Varney as a fish porter at London's Billingsgate Market.

Main cast
 Reg Varney as Reg Furnell
 Dilys Laye as Irene Furnell
 Geoffrey Hinsliff as Landlord at 'The Lamb'
 Helen Keating as Rosie, Canteen Girl
 Peter Spraggon as Harry
 Reg Lye as Old Wol
 Percy Herbert as Reg's Boss

References

Bibliography
 Quinlan, David. Quinlan's Illustrated Directory of Film Comedy Stars. Batsford, 1992.

External links
 

1975 British television series debuts
1976 British television series endings
1970s British comedy television series
ITV sitcoms
English-language television shows
Television shows produced by Associated Television (ATV)
Television shows shot at ATV Elstree Studios